Eupithecia persuastrix is a moth in the family Geometridae. It is found in the Russian Far East.

References

Moths described in 1990
persuastrix
Moths of Asia